Mads Juel Andersen (born 27 December 1997) is a Danish footballer who plays as a centre back for Barnsley.

Youth career
Mads Juel Andersen started his football career at Herstedøster Idræts Club (HIC) at the age of 5. He started because the other boys in the kindergarten already played there, and then it was a perfect way to be with his friends. His friends were the only reason why Mads started playing football. He had previously tried his hand at some athletics, but stopped because none of the friends went to that.

After playing 9 months in Albertslund IF, Andersen joined Brøndby IF at the age of 9.

Career

Brøndby IF
In November 2015, Andersen penned his first professional contract with Brøndby which meant, that he permanently would be a part of the first team squad from the upcoming 2016–17 season. On 12 April 2015, Andersen was called up to his first-ever game for the senior squad in a match against SønderjyskE, where he remained on the bench for the whole game.

In the 2015–16 season, Andersen was only called up for one game. In the following season, he was loaned out to HB Køge in the Danish 1st Division until the end of 2016. The deal was later extended to the end of the season. Andersen played 25 league games and scored two goals for the club before he returned to Brøndby.

Andersen got his debut for Brøndby in the Danish Cup against Ledøje-Smørum Fodbold, where he played all 90 minutes. However, he didn't make any appearances in the league for the club, before he left.

AC Horsens
On 27 September 2017 it was confirmed, that Andersen would join AC Horsens from the new year. From the 2018–19 season, Andersen turned in to a very important player for the club and became a starter for the team. He played 20 league games and scored three goals in that season.

Barnsley
On 21 June 2019, Andersen left AC Horsens to join Championship side Barnsley for a reported £900,000, signing a four-year contract. In his first season with the club, Andersen was a regular starter and played in almost every game. He scored his first goal for Barnsley in a 2-2 draw with Cardiff City on 27 January 2021.

Career statistics

References

External links

Mads Juel Andersen at DBU

1997 births
Living people
Danish men's footballers
Danish Superliga players
Danish 1st Division players
Brøndby IF players
HB Køge players
AC Horsens players
Barnsley F.C. players
Association football defenders
Danish expatriate men's footballers
People from Albertslund Municipality
Sportspeople from the Capital Region of Denmark